This is a list of notable events in country music that took place in the year 1937.

Events 
 sales rebounded to approximately 1/3 of 1929 levels
 October 30 – Johnnie Wright and Kitty Wells are married.

Top Hillbilly (Country) Recordings

The following songs were extracted from records included in Joel Whitburn's Pop Memories 1890-1954, record sales reported on the "Discography of American Historical Recordings" website, and other sources as specified. Numerical rankings are approximate, they are only used as a frame of reference.

Births 
 March 20 – Jerry Reed, "swamp rock"-styled singer and guitarist best known for novelty hits, most notably "When You're Hot, You're Hot" (died 2008).
 April 6 – Merle Haggard, innovator of the Bakersfield Sound and a huge country star since the 1960s (died 2016).
 June 15 – Waylon Jennings, influential rock-styled country performer and originator of the 1970s "outlaw" movement (died 2002).
 August 26 – Don Bowman, musician, songwriter and comedian, original host of radio's American Country Countdown (died 2013).
 November 1 – Bill Anderson, prolific singer-songwriter and television personality whose success has lasted more than 50 years; known as "Whisperin' Bill."
 November 30 – Jimmy Bowen, prominent record producer and executive from the 1970s through 1990s.
 December 16 – Jim Glaser, singer-songwriter and member of Tompall & the Glaser Brothers (died 2019).
 December 26 – Ronnie Prophet, Canadian country music singer (died 2018).

Deaths

Further reading 
 Kingsbury, Paul, "Vinyl Hayride: Country Music Album Covers 1947–1989," Country Music Foundation, 2003
 Millard, Bob, "Country Music: 70 Years of America's Favorite Music," HarperCollins, New York, 1993
 Whitburn, Joel. "Top Country Songs 1944–2005 – 6th Edition." 2005.

References

Country
Country music by year
Culture-related timelines by year